The Outside Track is a Pan Celtic group that performs Scots, Irish and Cape Breton songs and stepdance. Members of the group include Ailie Robertson who has won a LiveIreland Music Award and was a BBC Radio Scotland Young Traditional Musician finalist, and Fiona Black who was a winner of the BBC’s Fame Academy, as well as Mairi Rankin, a relative of the Rankin family from Mabou, Cape Breton. As a group they won ‘Best Group’ in the 2012 LiveIreland Music Award, a ‘Tradition In Review’ award, and was nominated for the 2013 MG Alba Scots Traditional Music Award. For their album Flash Company, they also won the German Radio Critics' Prize.

Discography
 Christmas Star (2022)
 Rise Up (2018)
 Light up the Dark (2015) 
 Flash Company (2013)
 The Mountain Road (2012)
 Curious Things Given Wings (2010)
 Self-Titled (2007)

References

Canadian Celtic music
Canadian Gaelic
Canadian folk music groups
Irish folk musical groups